This is a list of Bulgarian exonyms for places that do not use Bulgarian. This list includes only names that are significantly different from the local toponym, and archaic or obsolete names are italicized.

Albania

Austria

Czech Republic

Denmark

France

Greece

Italy

Moldova

North Macedonia

Portugal

Romania

Serbia

Switzerland

Tunisia

Turkey

Ukraine

See also

List of European exonyms

Bulgarian language
Lists of exonyms